The 1959/60 NTFL season was the 39th season of the Northern Territory Football League (NTFL).

St Marys have won their fourth premiership title while defeating the Buffaloes in the grand final by 47 points.

Grand Final

References 

Northern Territory Football League seasons
NTFL